Tron Theater may refer to:

 Teatro San Cassiano, formerly in Venice
 Tron Theatre, Scotland